The Roaming Regulation 2022 ((EU) 2022/612) bans roaming charges (Eurotariff) within the European Economic Area (EEA), which consists of the member states of the European Union, Iceland, Liechtenstein and Norway. This regulates both the charges mobile network operator can impose on its subscribers for using telephone and data services outside of the network's member state, and the wholesale rates networks can charge each other to allow their subscribers access to each other's networks. The 2012 Regulation was recast in 2022.

Since 2007, the roaming regulations have steadily lowered the maximum roaming charges allowable. In December 2016, the representatives of the Member States voted to abolish all roaming charges by June 2017  which eventually led to the abolition of all roaming charges for temporary roaming within the EEA as of 15 June 2017.

Provisions regulating roaming charges are contained in several regulations: Regulation No 531/2012 on roaming on public mobile communications networks within the Union, Regulation 2015/2120 and Regulation 2017/920 amending it, as well as Regulation 2016/2286 laying down detailed rules on the application of the fair use policy and Regulation 2021/2228 setting the weighted average of maximum mobile termination rates. As regards rules for wholesale roaming market, these are amended by Regulation 2017/920.

Originally due to expire after 30 June 2022, a 10-year extension was agreed upon in April 2022. The current roaming regulation expires after 30 June 2032.

History

Background 
The European Commission has often raised the issue of high roaming charges within the European Union. In October 2005, the European Commission launched a consumer website on roaming tariffs in order to highlight the issue, which included €12 for a 4-minute call.

In 2006, when high roaming charge rates persisted the Commission proposed to intervene in the market by setting maximum rates at which mobile network operators could charge their subscribers. The proposed regulation was approved by the European Parliament and by the Council of Ministers, and came into law in June 2007. It required capping of retail and wholesale voice roaming charges from 30 August 2007, unless a special roaming tariff applied. The maximum prices was set to decrease further in 2008 and 2009. The regulation also required that customers travelling to another member state would receive a text message of the charges that apply for roaming services. Originally the capping measures were introduced on a temporary basis and were due to expire on 30 June 2010.

The law was amended in 2009 based on a review carried out under the 2007 regulation. The expiry date of the 2007 regulation was extended to 30 June 2012 and was extended to text messages and data roaming. It also provided for further annual reductions in the price capping until the expiry of the regulation and for compulsory per-second billing after 30 seconds for calls made, and per-second billing throughout for calls received.

Having still found that market conditions did not justify lifting the capping of roaming within the EEA, the EU replaced the law in 2012. Under the 2012 regulation retail roaming capping charges expired in 2017 and wholesale capping charges are due to expire in 2022.

Roam like at home (RLAH) 
In 2013 the Commission proposed to establish a single market for electronic communications within the Union and to abolish roaming charges. The proposal was approved by the European Parliament on 3 April 2014, by a margin of 534 votes to 25. As drafted it would have ended roaming charges from 15 December 2015. The Council of the European Union has to approve legislation before it can take effect, and ended up rejecting the specifics of the proposed legislation.

Regulation (EU) 2015/2120 which was adopted on 25 November 2015 provided for the phased reduction of roaming charges within the European Union. As a transitional measure, from May 2016 the existing price capping for roaming within the EEA was replaced by a maximum surcharge for roaming services which may be charged in addition to domestic charges. This however would not increase the cost of roaming for customers whose domestic rates plus the surcharge resulted in a higher price than the existing price caps. It reduced the charges for consumers with lower domestic prices or who pay for monthly allowances for using a particular service.

The Regulation also required the commission to submit a report to the European Parliament by June 2016 along with proposed legislative for regulation of the wholesale roaming market within the EU with a view to eliminating the transitional roaming surcharges by June 2017. Following the proposal made by the commission, the European Parliament and Member States reached an agreement on 31 January 2017 to set the subsequent wholesale roaming caps from 15 June 2017:
 €0.032 per min of voice call,
 €0.01 per SMS message,
 A step by step reduction over 5 years for data caps decreasing from €7.7/GB (on 15 June 2017) to €6/GB (01/01/2018), €4.5/GB (01/01/2019), €3.5/GB (01/01/2020), €3/GB (01/01/2021) and €2.5/GB (01/01/2022)
On 8 February 2017 member states' ambassadors endorsed the deal on wholesale caps that put an end to retail mobile roaming charges in the EU on 15 June 2017.

Fair use policy 
To prevent misuse (i.e. cheaper tariffs available in the western members to be used constantly in the eastern members where tariffs are higher) a fair-use policy was mandated which would allow EEA citizens to use their phones while roaming without extra charges for business and leisure, but would still limit the use to prevent misuse and extra costs to mobile operators.

5 September 2016 proposal (retracted)

The initial proposal for a fair use policy was published on 5 September 2016. It would have limited the amount of free roaming to 90 days in a calendar year and a maximum of 30 consecutive days, after which regulated roaming charges (now in force) would apply. Registering in your home network on a given day would not count that day towards the limit. The proposal also stated that "the customer should nevertheless be able to consume volumes of such services equivalent to at least the average volume consumed domestically by the customers of the tariff plan in question", preventing operators from setting low call/data limits.

However, the proposal was hastily withdrawn just a couple of days after being published. Only a note on the commission's web site remained: "An initial draft was published on 5.9.2016. The Commission services have, on the instruction of President Juncker, withdrawn the draft and are working on a new version").

The proposal was also slammed by the telco lobbyists (GSMA & ETNO) claiming it would have been "..too complex to implement and unclear for consumers." They were inclined to set the cap lower, believing a "30 consecutive days granted to each consumer within the proposal would have already covered 100% of the needs of the vast majority of European citizens." Also, legal concerns were cited stating that "In Denmark, for example, the maximum length of a contract is six months, so customers would have been able to 'reset' their roaming allowance twice a year."

Finally, it was suggested to come up with a new proposal that would be "easy to execute, and effectively prevent arbitrage and distortions on domestic markets" and warning by quoting the Commission that "Otherwise, network quality and investments in new capacity in some Member States could be affected".

21 September 2016 Press release

A press release issued on 21 September (IP/16/3111) reaffirmed the end of roaming charges in the EU by 2017 stating that "there should be no limits in terms of timing or volume imposed on consumers when using their mobile devices abroad in the EU." The new mechanism, although not defined in detail, "will be based on principle of residence or stable links European consumers may have with any EU Member State." (note the "any" - meaning multiple countries). A stable link is defined as: "work commuters, expats who are frequently present in their home country or Erasmus students." The final proposal was set to be published by 15 December 2016 following feedback from BEREC, Member States and all interested parties.

Consequences 

As mobile operators still have to pay for wholesale charges when subscribers are roaming on other EEA networks, some operators have increased their subscription prices. In Norway, prices increased by 66% when RLAH was introduced. The same argument was being used by Danish operators. In Denmark several operators increased monthly subscription prices by 10–20 DKK.

Swedish operator Comviq removed roaming services on its plan "Fastpris mini" 15 June 2017. The operator Hallon is doing the same to its smallest plan "LITEN" starting 1 October 2017. In Denmark, operator Telmore introduced "TELMORE Home" without roaming services, even when travelling to countries outside the EEA. Vodafone UK introduced "UK-only plans" that disallow roaming altogether. This is possible because, while the Regulation disallows operators from charging extra for roaming when available, it does not force them to make roaming available in the first place.

Mobile operators in the EEA are also using "loopholes" in the Regulation to retain roaming charges. Operators can continue to impose surcharges if they can substantiate to the national regulators that they are unable to recover their "actual or projected costs" of providing roaming services.

Agcom, the Italian communications regulator has told Italian operators Vodafone, Telecom Italia and Lycamobile they must comply with all aspects of the roaming regulations, as they believed some features were not being universally applied. In Sweden, the Swedish Post and Telecom Authority has started investigating whether Comviq is in compliance with the roaming regulations. For prepaid cards, Comviq requires customers to top up an "EU package" costing approximately twice as much as a domestic one. O2 UK has admitted it temporarily throttled roaming speeds across Europe following the abolition of roaming charges.

Since Roam like at home was introduced, Telenor Norway have experienced a 150–200% increase in data usage compared with the same period in 2016. The operator introduced free roaming in the EEA for most of its subscription plans in 2016, and from February 2016 to February 2017 data usage while roaming in the EEA increased by 900 percent. Telenor Sweden reports a 1500% increase in data usage while roaming in the EEA.

Non-roaming charges for international calls/texts

The European Union roaming regulations only regulate prices while the user is roaming. In 2013, the European commission proposed to regulate intra-EEA international calls, but it was rejected by the European Parliament and Council.

In 2018, the EU Parliament and Council (EU co-legislators) provisionally agreed on a reform of EU telecom rules. According to the provisional deal, the fees for intra-EU calls are capped to 19 cents for phone calls and 6 cents for text messages by 2019. Once the Parliament and the Council approve the provisional deal, Member States will have two years to transpose the Electronic Communications Code into national law.

According to Regulation (EU) 2018/1971 of the European Parliament and of the Council of 11 December 2018, any retail price (excluding VAT) charged to retail consumers for regulated intra-EU communications shall, starting 15 May 2019, not exceed:

 €0.19 per minutes of voice call,
 €0.06 per SMS message.

Business users in some Member States continue to pay the "original" international call rates of up to €1 per minute.

Territorial extent 

European Union roaming regulations apply to the 30 members of the European Economic Area; the 27 members of the EU and their outermost regions plus three EFTA member states Iceland, Liechtenstein and Norway. The EU countries have applied the roaming regulation since 30 August 2007 while the remaining EEA countries have applied it since 1 January 2008.

 
 
  

 
   
   

   
      

 

On 7 June 2017, Boris Iarochevitch, Head of Division of the Eastern Partnership, Regional Cooperation and OSCE – European External Action Service, told Georgia's Public Broadcaster that the EU plans to abolish roaming fees for the six members of the Eastern Partnership; Georgia, Ukraine, Azerbaijan, Armenia, Moldova, and Belarus by 2020. EU4Digital team stated that Regional Roaming Agreement will gradually reduce roaming prices within the Eastern partner countries. By the end of 2026, retail prices of roaming services for citizens of the signatory countries are expected to be reduced by 87%.

At the Sofia summit in May 2018, Western Balkan countries agreed to reduce roaming costs among themselves, and the EU pledged to develop a roadmap to reduce the roaming costs between the EU and the countries in the Western Balkans; Albania, Kosovo, Bosnia and Herzegovina, North Macedonia, Montenegro and Serbia. In Skopje on 18 February 2019, European Commissioner for Digital Economy and Society, Mariya Gabriel confirmed that once the Western Balkans reaches the new agreement on roaming prices among its economies, the EU stands ready for the reduction of tariffs between the WB and the EU. On 4 April 2019, at the 2nd Western Balkans Digital Summit in Belgrade, the Western Balkan Ministers for Telecommunications signed the Regional Roaming Agreement which would gradually remove all roaming costs in the region. The agreement came into effect on 1 July 2019, enabling significantly lower roaming charges in the Western Balkans. Since 1 July 2021, all roaming tariffs have been removed, meaning no surcharge to the domestic retail price for calls, SMS & data while roaming in Western Balkans, similar to the concept of "Roam like at Home". It is expected that gradual reduction of the roaming costs between Western Balkans and European Economic Area will start by 2023, which will eventually leads to a roaming free zone beyond the EEA's borders in 2027.

Areas not covered
The regulations do not apply to areas which are connected to member states but are outside the EU. Saint Martin, an overseas collectivity of France which is part of the EU and has free roaming for EU phones, while in Sint Maarten, a constituent country of the Kingdom of the Netherlands and the other half of the Caribbean island, prices are high, as it is not part of the EU.

The last member state of EFTA, Switzerland, is not party to the EEA agreement, and is instead linked to the EU by a series of bilateral agreements. Despite close relations with the EU in several fields, the regulations do not apply to Switzerland. Monaco, Andorra and San Marino have cooperation with the EU, like usage of the euro, but not free roaming.

The United Kingdom left the EU in the end of January 2020. In accordance with the Brexit withdrawal agreement, free roaming was kept during a transition period ending on 31 December 2020. Free roaming UK–EU its no longer guaranteed as the regulations are contained within a European regulation and not a directive, and have not been incorporated into UK law. However, some UK mobile providers, such as O2 and Virgin Mobile have continued to allow free roaming for UK citizens in the EEA after the end of the Brexit transition period.

Prices

Common limits 
All roaming charges for temporary roaming were abolished on 15 June 2017 (fair-use rules apply). The tariffs covering the period from 30 April 2016 are maximum surcharges to the price paid in the home network.

Local price limits 

For services paid for in currencies other than the euro, the amount in euro is converted to the other currency using the reference rates published in the Official Journal of the European Union (OJoEU). After the adoption of EU regulation 531/2012 the retail exchange rate to be used for the relevant year should be calculated by taking the average of the reference exchange rates published in the OJoEU on 1 March, 1 April and 1 May of that year, with the new exchange rate coming into force on 1 July of that year. The wholesale exchange rate however is taken from only the rate published on 1 May of that year.

From 1 July 2021 the maximum surcharges on retail prices (when not covered by roam like at home, such as when the fair-use policy hits in), including VAT, are as follows in local currencies (data prices are updated 1 January every year):

Exchange rates

Method of calculating 
As the VAT rates and currencies vary across the EEA, the European Commission publishes price caps in euro and excluding VAT. So the final prices for each country can be calculated by adding the corresponding VAT rate and converting to the currency of the country (if non-euro).

In order to avoid double taxation, non-taxation or the distortion of competition, an EU member state may, in accordance with Article 9(3)(a) of Council Directive 77/388 ("the Sixth VAT Directive"), include within the scope of its national VAT any telecommunications services used within its territory but billed outside the EU VAT area. When opting to do so, it must also exempt from its national VAT any roaming services supplied by home networks within its territory but used outside the EU VAT area. The inclusion of telecommunications within the scope of Article 9 was requested by the former EU member state United Kingdom. Consequently, when an EU member state makes this VAT exemption, roaming on networks in Åland, Iceland, Liechtenstein, Norway, the Canary Islands, Ceuta, Melilla and French overseas departments is subject to the price caps with no VAT applied, because these countries and territories are within the EEA but outside the EU VAT area.

Rounding 
The charge limits for the Eurotariff and the wholesale average charge should be calculated to the maximum number of decimal places permitted by the official exchange rate. This sets the maximum that can be charged in the national currency. Providers may wish in practice to quote charges in whole numbers of currency units, especially at the retail level, although this in practice is not compulsory. In this case, the numbers should be rounded down. Rounding up of these numbers to above the level of the relevant cap is not permitted under any circumstances.

See also
Digital Single Market
Roaming
Telecommunications in Europe
Regional Roaming Agreement

References

External links
Procedure File: 2013/0309(COD) - The proposed EU law which includes the abolition of all roaming charges.

717-2007
International telecommunications
Telecommunications in Europe
2007 in law
2007 in the European Union